The 2015–16 AFC Ajax season saw the club participate in the Eredivisie, the KNVB Cup, the UEFA Champions League and the UEFA Europa League. The first training took place on 6 July 2015 while the traditional AFC Ajax Open Day was held on 20 July.

Pre-season
The first training for the 2015–16 season was held on 6 June 2015. In preparation for the new season, Ajax organized a training stage in Neustift, Austria. The squad, with manager Frank de Boer, remained there from 15 to 24 June. During this training stage, a friendly match was played against Dynamo Moscow, whereupon the club then traveled back to the Netherlands, residing at De Lutte for additional training. The squad stayed there from 30 June to 5 July, when further friendly matches were played against Nordsjælland, Panathinaikos and VfL Wolfsburg. Traveling to France, a further friendly match was played against Saint-Étienne.

Player statistics 
Appearances for competitive matches only

|-
|}
As of 7 March 2016

2015–16 selection by nationality

Team statistics

Eredivisie standings 2015–16

Points by match day

Total points by match day

Standing by match day

Goals by match day

Statistics for the 2015–16 season
This is an overview of all the statistics for played matches in the 2014–15 season.

2015–16 team records

Topscorers

Placements

Competitions
All times are in CEST

Eredivisie

League table

Matches

KNVB Cup

UEFA Champions League

Third qualifying round

UEFA Europa League

Qualifying rounds

Play-off round

Group stage

Matches

Friendlies

Transfers for 2015–16

Summer transfer window
For a list of all Dutch football transfers in the summer window (1 July 2015 to 31 August 2015) please see List of Dutch football transfers summer 2015.

Arrivals 
 The following players moved to AFC Ajax.

Departures 
 The following players moved from AFC Ajax.

Winter transfer window 
For a list of all Dutch football transfers in the winter window (1 January 2016 to 1 February 2016) please see List of Dutch football transfers winter 2015–16.

Arrivals 
 The following players moved to AFC Ajax.

Departures 
 The following players moved from AFC Ajax.

References

Ajax
AFC Ajax seasons
Ajax
Ajax